Garfield and Friends is an American animated children's television series that aired on CBS from 1988 to 1994 for a total of 121 episodes over seven seasons.

Series overview

Episodes 
Episode key
 Garfield: Orange
 U.S. Acres: Green

Season 1 (1988)

Season 2 (1989)

Season 3 (1990)

Season 4 (1991)

Season 5 (1992)

Season 6 (1993)

Season 7 (1994)

Crossover special (1990)

References

External links 
 
 Garfield and Friends Episode Guide on Mark Evanier's web site

Garfield and Friends, List of episodes